D'Ambrosio or d'Ambrosio is an Italian surname.

It also may refer to:

Alfredo D'Ambrosio (1871–1914), Italian violinist and composer
Antonino D'Ambrosio (born 1971), Italian-American author, filmmaker, producer, and visual artist
Brian Anthony D'Ambrosio, American journalist and author 
Charles D'Ambrosio (born 1958), American short story writer and essayist
Danilo D'Ambrosio (born 1988), Italian football (soccer) player
Dario D'Ambrosio (born 1988), Italian football (soccer) player
Diego D'Ambrosiano, founder of Diego's Hair Salon in Washington, D.C.
Domenico D'Ambrosio (born 1975), former Italian male long-distance runner 
Gerardo D'Ambrosio (1930-2015), Italian magistrate and politician
Jérôme d'Ambrosio (born 1985), Belgian racing driver of Italian descent 
Joe D'Ambrosio (born 1953), American sports broadcaster and play-by-play announcer
Lily D'Ambrosio (born 1964), Australian politician
Louis D'Ambrosio, businessman, former CEO of Sears Holdings Corporation and of Avaya
Marcelo D'Ambrosio, Uruguayan sprint canoer
Meredith D'Ambrosio (born 1941), American jazz singer
Ossian D'Ambrosio (born 1970), Italian modern Druid, musician and jeweler
Pasquale D'Ambrosio
Paul D'Ambrosio, American journalist and novelist
Pompeo D'Ambrosio (1917–1998), Venezuelan businessman of Italian origin
Ubiratàn D'Ambrosio (1932–2021), Brazilian historian of mathematics and mathematics teacher
Vanessa D'Ambrosio (born 1988), Captain Regent of San Marino from April until October 2017 (alongside Mimma Zavoli)
Vito D'Ambrosio (born 1957), Italian-American actor

See also
Ambrosiano (disambiguation)
Ambrosio (disambiguation)

Italian-language surnames